The 2020 Copa Argentina Final was the 89th and final match of the 2019–20 Copa Argentina. It was played on December 8, 2021 at Estadio Único Madre de Ciudades in Santiago del Estero between Boca Juniors and Talleres (C).

Originally scheduled to be held in 2020, the final (and the entire tournament itself) was delayed after on 17 March 2020, the Argentine Football Association (AFA) announced the suspension of the competition to prevent the spread of the coronavirus COVID-19. After several months the tournament resumed on 23 December 2020.

Boca Juniors defeated Talleres (C) in the final on penalties to win their fourth tournament title. As champions, they qualified for the 2022 Copa Libertadores group stage and the 2021 Supercopa Argentina.

Qualified teams

Road to the final

Match details

Statistics

References

External links
 

2020 in Argentine football
2019–20
2019–20 domestic association football cups
a